Sundadanio retiarius is a danionin in the family Cyprinidae. It is endemic to Kalimantan, Indonesian Borneo, and known from the Kotawaringin and Kahayan River drainages. It lives in peat swamps and blackwater streams.

Sundadanio retiarius reaches a maximum size of  standard length.

References

Sundadanio
Endemic fauna of Borneo
Freshwater fish of Borneo
Endemic fauna of Indonesia
Freshwater fish of Indonesia
Taxa named by Kevin W. Conway
Taxa named by Maurice Kottelat
Taxa named by Heok Hui Tan
Fish described in 2011